Geoffrey Emett Blackman (1903-1980)  was the Sibthorpian Professor of Rural Economy at the University of Oxford from 1945 to 1970 and Director of Agricultural Research Council Unit of Experimental Agronomy from 1950 to 1970.

References

Fellows of the Royal Society
1903 births

1980 deaths